Jaye Howard Jr. (born December 20, 1988) is a former American football defensive end. He played college football for the University of Florida, where he was a member of a BCS National Championship team. He was drafted by the Seattle Seahawks in the fourth round of the 2012 NFL Draft.

College career
While attending the University of Florida on an athletic scholarship, Howard played for coach Urban Meyer and coach Will Muschamp's Florida Gators football teams from 2008 to 2011. The coaching staff red-shirted him as true freshman in 2007, and played in nine games in 2008. As a redshirt sophomore in 2009, Howard played in twelve games during the Gators' undefeated regular season. During his 2010 junior year, he appeared in eleven games, starting eight of them, but missing the rest with an ankle injury. As a senior in 2011, Howard started all thirteen games and memorably scored a touchdown on a fumble recovery against the Kentucky Wildcats. He finished his four-year Gators career with 131 tackles and 25.5 for a loss.

Professional career

Seattle Seahawks
The Seattle Seahawks selected Howard in the fourth round, with the 114th overall pick in the 2012 NFL Draft. He was released by the Seahawks on August 31, 2013.

Kansas City Chiefs
Howard was claimed off waivers by the Chiefs on September 1, 2013. 

On March 9, 2016, Howard signed a two-year $12 million deal to stay with the Chiefs through 2017. He was placed on injured reserve on December 1, 2016 with a hip injury.

On April 22, 2017, Howard was released by the Chiefs.

Chicago Bears
On May 4, 2017, Howard signed a one-year contract with the Chicago Bears . He was released on September 2, 2017.

Career statistics

See also
 List of Florida Gators in the NFL Draft

References

External links
Chicago Bears bio
Florida Gators bio

1988 births
Living people
Players of American football from Orlando, Florida
American football defensive tackles
Jones High School (Orlando, Florida) alumni
Florida Gators football players
Seattle Seahawks players
Kansas City Chiefs players
Chicago Bears players